Robert Hewson (4 August 1893 – 21 October 1972) was an Australian cricketer. He played thirteen first-class matches for Western Australia between 1924/25 and 1931/32.

See also
 List of Western Australia first-class cricketers

References

External links
 

1893 births
1972 deaths
Australian cricketers
Western Australia cricketers
Cricketers from Melbourne